Tantawangalo is an Australian locality in the Bega Valley Shire and the Eden-Monaro federal electorate. It contains a significant portion of the South East Forests National Park and borders onto the Tantawangalo State Forest. It contains the scenic Six Mile Creek Campground.

References

Localities in New South Wales
Bega Valley Shire